The Leslie T. Applegate House, at 410 Maple St. in Falmouth, Kentucky, was built in 1888.  It was listed on the National Register of Historic Places in 1983.

It is a Shingle Style house which was built for locally prominent lawyer Leslie T. Applegate.  Its exterior has been restored to its original appearance.  It was deemed to be the "best example of late 19th century residence on Maple Street (site of early Falmouth 'suburb') with integrity intact".

References

Shingle Style architecture in Kentucky
National Register of Historic Places in Pendleton County, Kentucky
Houses completed in 1888
1888 establishments in Kentucky
Houses in Pendleton County, Kentucky
Houses on the National Register of Historic Places in Kentucky
Falmouth, Kentucky